Hao or Haojing, also called Zongzhou, was one of the two settlements comprising the capital of the Western Zhou dynasty (1066–770 BCE), the other being Fēng or Fēngjīng. Together they were known as Fenghao and stood on opposite banks of the Feng River: with Feng on west bank and Hao on the east bank. Archaeological discoveries indicate that the ruins of Haojing lie next to the Feng River around the north end of Doumen Subdistrict in present-day Xi'an, Shaanxi Province. It was the center of government for King Wu of Zhou (r. 1046-1043 BCE).

History
King Wen of Zhou (r. 1099-1056 BCE) moved the Zhou capital eastward from Qíyì to Fēngjīng; his son King Wu later relocated across the river to Haojing, next to a certain lake Hao (鎬池). Fēngjīng became the site of the Zhou ancestral shrine and gardens whilst Haojing contained the royal residence and government headquarters. The settlement was also known as Zōngzhōu to indicate its role as the capital of the vassal states.

During the reign of King Cheng of Zhou (r. 1042–1021 BCE), the Duke of Zhou built a second settlement at Luoyi, also known as Chengzhou, in order to reinforce control of the eastern part of the kingdom. From then on, although King Cheng was permanently stationed in Chengzhou, Haojing remained the main operations center.

At the time of King Zhao of Zhou (r. 996–977 BCE), further reinforcement of the eastern part of the Zhou kingdom took place thus Chéngzhōu became the major center of operations.

In King You of Zhou's reign (r. 781–771 BCE), the Marquess of Shen with support from Quanrong nomads from the west overran Hàojīng heralding the end of the Western Zhou dynasty. All the royal buildings in the settlement were razed to the ground although it is not known if those in Fēngjīng survived the conflagration. The newly enthroned King Ping of Zhou (r. 770-720 BCE) thereafter had no choice but to move the capital east to Chéngzhōu. For sometime after, there were still people who referred to themselves as "Western Zhou" and to Chéngzhōu as Zōngzhōu.

See also
 Historical capitals of China

References

History of Xi'an
Zhou dynasty
Archaeological sites in China
Former cities in China